Schinia jaguarina, the jaguar flower moth, is a moth of the family Noctuidae. The species was first described by Achille Guenée in 1852. It is found on North America's Great Plains from Saskatchewan and Alberta south to Texas, eastward on coast to Florida and westward in south to Arizona. In Mexico it is found down to Mexico City.

The wingspan is about 30 mm. Adults are on wing from June to July.

The larvae feed on Baptisia, Pediomelum rhombifolium, Psoralidium tenuiflorum and Trifolium.

External links

"Schinia jaguarina (Guenée 1852)". Moths of North Dakota. Retrieved November 12, 2020.

Schinia
Moths of North America
Moths described in 1852